The 2022–23 North Dakota State Bison women's basketball team represents North Dakota State University during the 2022-23 NCAA Division I women's basketball season. The Bison, led by 4th year head coach Jory Collins, play their home games at the Scheels Center, as members of the Summit League. After NDSU's win over St. Thomas on February 23rd, the Bison clinched their highest Division I win count since 2008. The Bison clinched the second seed in the Summit League tournament, the highest mark in a conference tournament since their Division II days. 
Unfortunately, their tournament run ended in the quarterfinals of the tournament when they lost to 10th seeded Kansas City. 

The Bison were automatically invited to the 2023 Women's National Invitation Tournament since Summit League regular season champion, South Dakota State, made the NCAA tournament. Their postseason run ended in the WNIT first round when they lost to Oregon, 96–57.

Previous Season
The Bison finished the 2021-22 season 11-18, 7-11 in Summit League play to finish in sixth place. In the Summit League Tournament, they lost to 3rd seeded Kansas City to be eliminated from the tournament.

Offseason

Departures

Source:

Incoming transfers

2022 recruiting class

Roster

Schedule and results

|-
!colspan=12 style=| Non-conference regular season

|-
!colspan=9 style=| Summit League regular season

|-
!colspan=12 style=| Summit League Tournament

|-
!colspan=12 style=| Women's National Invitation Tournament (WNIT)

Sources:

Awards and Accolades

Summit League Player of the Week

Summit League Regular Season Awards

Freshman of the Year
Elle Evans

All-Summit League First Team
Heaven Hamling

All-Summit League Honorable Mention
Elle Evans

All-Summit League Defensive Team
Elle Evans

All-Summit League Newcomer Team
Elle Evans

Source:

References

North Dakota State
North Dakota State Bison women's basketball seasons
North Dakota State Bison women's basketball
North Dakota State Bison women's basketball
North Dakota State